Rising is a 1995 album by avant-garde artist Yoko Ono. Released on 7 November, on Capitol Records, it features the backing band IMA (Japanese for "Now"), which included Ono's son Sean Lennon, Timo Ellis, and Sam Koppelman. It was her first album of new material since 1985's Starpeace album. The album has sold 11,000 copies in the US to date.

Reception

The British newspaper The Guardian named the album "Pop CD of the week" in January 1996. In their review, the album was described as an "unexpected minor triumph". The reviewer, Dan Glaister, further noted that "underlying all the hurt and anger" was also "an overwhelming honesty and humanity" and that the album "succeeds in imparting enormous positivity". Glaister singled out the track "Kurushi" as a "haunting, gentle call to a loved one" and described "Goodbye, My Love" as a "mournful, jolly little ballad a la McCartney".

Bruce Hainley of art magazine Artforum International felt that the album "affirms her amazing talents as a musician" and described it as "an uncompromising blend of Conceptual art and rock 'n' roll" with Yoko using a "wide range of vocals [...] from the aggressive to the sultry to fusion". He also felt that it was "hard to imagine a better place to start for those unfamiliar with her work". Hainley also praised the remix album Rising Mixes, which "[showed] the continuing reach of Ono's influence on rock since the '70s". He described the bonus song "Franklin Summer" as "hypnotic".

Track listing
All songs written by Yoko Ono.
"Warzone" – 1:55
"Wouldnit" – 3:02
"Ask the Dragon" – 4:12
"New York Woman" – 2:07
"Talking to the Universe" – 3:31
"Turned the Corner" – 2:58
"I'm Dying" – 6:18
"Where Do We Go from Here?" – 3:02
"Kurushi" – 7:59
"Will I" – 2:27
"Rising" – 14:28
"Goodbye My Love" – 2:22
"Revelations" – 5:35
"Ask the Dragon" (Ween Remix) – 4:49 (Japanese Edition Bonus Track)
"Talking to the Universe" (Cibo Matto Remix) – 4:21 (Japanese Edition Bonus Track)

Rising Mixes (released 3 June 1996)

"Talking to the Universe" (Cibo Matto Remix) (4.21)
"The Source" (ABA All Stars) (4.58)
"Ask the Dragon" (Ween Remix) (4.49)
"Where Do We Go from Here?" (Tricky Remix) (5.07)
"Rising" (Thurston Moore Remix) (8.48)
"Franklin Summer" (Yoko Ono/IMA)* (30.02)

The ABA All Stars remix is credited to Miho Hatori, Yuka Honda and Sean Lennon (the members of Cibo Matto), as well as Adam Yauch of the Beastie Boys. Keiji Haino, Masonna, Monde Bruits, Incapacitants, C.C.C.C., Hanatarash, MSBR, and The Gerogerigegege are also credited as performers in Thurston Moore's remix of "Rising".

A vinyl promo version was released with the track listing:-
"Ask the Dragon" (Ween Remix) (4.49)
"Talking to the Universe" (Cibo Matto Remix) (4.23)
"The Source" (ABA All Stars) (4.58)
"Where Do We Go from Here?" (Tricky Remix) (5.04)
"Rising" (Thurston Moore Remix) (8.48)
"Kurushi (Perry Farrell Mix)" (7.26)

Personnel
 Yoko Ono – vocals
 Sean Ono Lennon – guitars, bass guitar, backing vocals, keyboards
 Timo Ellis – guitars, bass guitar, drums 
 Sam Koppelman – bass, drums, percussions

Production 
 Yoko Ono, Rob Stevens – producers 
 Alfred Brand, Chris Habeck, Mike Anzelowitz, Wes Naprstek – engineers 
 David Ayers – A&R 
 George Marino – mastering
 Rob Stevens, Yoko Ono – mixing 
 Recorded at Broome Street – Timo Ellis (track : 4) 
 Recorded at Quad Recording – Rob Stevens (tracks: 1–3,5–13)

Release history 
Rising

Rising Mixes

References

 Musicians, Production : https://www.discogs.com/fr/Yoko-Ono-Ima-Rising/release/486555

Yoko Ono albums
1995 albums
Capitol Records albums
Albums produced by Yoko Ono